The 1964 SANFL Grand Final was an Australian rules football competition.  beat Port Adelaide 9.15 (69) to 5.12 (42).

This win was South Adelaide's eleventh (and as of 2021) most recent premiership, having won the wooden spoon in 1963 with a 1–17 record.

References 

SANFL Grand Finals
SANFL Grand Final, 1964